The Red Cones are a pair of cinder cones near Devils Postpile National Monument, in eastern Madera County of central California. They are within the eastern Sierra Nevada and Inyo National Forest.

Volcanic geology
The Red Cones last erupted approximately 5000 years ago, with both cinder eruption (forming the cones), and a basalt flow from the southern cone, which flowed approximately  towards the upper Middle Fork of the San Joaquin River.

The Red Cones are at the southern end of the Mono-Inyo Craters, the magma for the Red Cones shares its origin with the other Mono-Inyo craters.

See also
Long Valley caldera
Panum Crater

References

Cinder cones of the United States
Volcanoes of Madera County, California
Inyo National Forest
Landforms of the Sierra Nevada (United States)
Volcanoes of California